Vyadhapura (Sanskrit: व्याधपूर Vyādhapūra) was an ancient city of the Funan civilization, likely in what is now Ba Phnum District in the province of Prey Veng, Cambodia.

History 
Vyadhapura, the city of the hunter king, named in honour of Hun P'an-huang. It was the capital of the Kingdom of Funan early in its history, located near the Funan's sacred mountain of Ba Phnom. Chinese reports indicated that it was about 193,121 km or 120 miles from the sea.

References

Angkorian sites in Takéo Province
Former populated places in Cambodia
Funan
Ancient cities